Guaifenesin, also known as glyceryl guaiacolate, is an expectorant medication that aids in the elimination of sputum from the respiratory tract. Chemically it is an ether of guaiacol and glycerine. It is often used in combination with other medications. It is taken by mouth.

Side effects may include dizziness, sleepiness, skin rash, and nausea. While it has not been properly studied in pregnancy, it appears to be safe. It is believed to work by making airway secretions more liquid.

Guaifenesin has been used medically since at least 1933. It is available as a generic medication and over the counter. In 2020, it was the 324th most commonly prescribed medication in the United States, with more than 800,000 prescriptions.

Medical use
Guaifenesin is used to try to help with coughing up thick mucus and is sometimes combined with dextromethorphan, an antitussive (cough suppressant), such as in Mucinex DM or Robitussin DM. It is also combined with ephedrine to produce Primatene and Bronkaid tablets for symptomatic relief of asthma.

Side effects
Side-effects of guaifenesin include nausea, vomiting, formation of kidney stones, diarrhea, and constipation.  Nausea and vomiting can be reduced by taking guaifenesin with meals.  The risk of forming kidney stones during prolonged use can be reduced by maintaining good hydration and increasing the pH of urine. Rarely, severe allergic reactions may occur, including a rash or swelling of the lips or gums, which may require urgent medical assistance.  Mild dry mouth or chapped lips may also occur when taking this medication. Drinking a glass of water is recommended with each dose of guaifenesin.

Pharmacology

Mechanism of action
Guaifenesin is thought to act as an expectorant by increasing the volume and reducing the viscosity of secretions in the trachea and bronchi. It may aid in the flow of respiratory tract secretions, allowing ciliary movement to carry the loosened secretions upward toward the pharynx. Thus, it may increase the efficiency of the cough reflex and facilitate removal of the secretions.

Guaifenesin has muscle relaxant and anticonvulsant properties and may act as an NMDA receptor antagonist.

History
Similar medicines derived from the guaiac tree were in use as a generic remedy by American indigenous peoples when explorers reached North America in the 16th century. The Spanish encountered guaiacum wood "when they conquered Santo Domingo; it was soon brought back to Europe, where it acquired an immense reputation in the sixteenth century as a cure for syphilis and certain other diseases..."

The 1955 edition of the Textbook of Pharmacognosy states: "Guaiacum has a local stimulant action which is sometimes useful in sore throat. The resin is used in chronic gout and rheumatism, whilst the wood is an ingredient in the compound concentrated solution of sarsaparilla, which was formerly much used as an alternative in syphilis."

In the US, guaifenesin was first approved by the Food and Drug Administration (FDA) in 1952. Although previously deemed "Generally Regarded as Safe" in its original approval, the drug received a New Drug Application for the extended-release version, which received approval on 12 July 2002. Because of this, the FDA then issued letters to other manufacturers of timed-release guaifenesin to stop marketing their unapproved versions, leaving Adams Respiratory Therapeutics in control of the market. In 2007, Adams was acquired by Reckitt Benckiser. The drug is sold over-the-counter by many companies, alone and in combination.

Availability

Guaifenesin is taken by mouth. It is available under many brand names, as either the lone active ingredient or as one part of a combination drug. Drugs combined with guaifenesin in over-the-counter preparations include the cough-suppressant dextromethorphan, analgesics such as paracetamol/acetaminophen, and decongestants such as ephedrine, pseudoephedrine, or phenylephrine.

Veterinary use
Guaifenesin's neurological properties first became known in the late 1940s.  Guaifenesin is a centrally acting muscle relaxant used routinely in large-animal veterinary surgery.  Guaifenesin is used in combination with, for example, ketamine, since guaifenesin does not provide analgesia nor does it produce unconsciousness.

Research
The guaifenesin protocol was studied as a method to treat fibromyalgia; a one-year double-blind study found that the treatment performs no better than placebo.

Guaifenesin was studied as a possible fertility medication, working by thinning and increasing the stretchability (spinnbarkeit) of the cervical mucus, during the few days before ovulation, thus facilitating sperm penetration.

Results from a 2014 study by the Virginia Commonwealth University's Department of Pediatrics indicated that guaifenesin did not have significant impact on sputum production or clearance in upper respiratory infections. This was consistent with a 2014 study involving 378 adult and adolescent participants, which indicated guaifenesin had no significant effect as either mucolytic or expectorant compared to placebo: "Although the upper respiratory quality of life improved over the course of the study in both the [guaifenesin] and placebo groups, this improvement was not accompanied by changes in sputum properties".

References

External links
 
 

Drugs with unknown mechanisms of action
Expectorants
Catechol ethers
Wikipedia medicine articles ready to translate
Glycerol ethers
Methoxy compounds